Gurs  is a commune in the Pyrénées-Atlantiques department in south-western France.

History
Gurs was the site of the Gurs internment camp. Nothing remains of the camp; after World War II, a forest was planted on the site where it stood.

Geography
Gurs is located near Pau.

Neighboring communes:
 Jasses - northwest
 Sus - northwest
 Dognen - east
 Moncayolle-Larrory-Mendibieu - west
 L'Hôpital-Saint-Blaise - southwest
 Préchacq-Josbaig - south

See also
Communes of the Pyrénées-Atlantiques department
Gurs internment camp

References

Communes of Pyrénées-Atlantiques
Pyrénées-Atlantiques communes articles needing translation from French Wikipedia